Dezhkord (also Romanized as Eslāmīyeh; also known as Dez-e-Kord, Dez Gerd, Dez Kard, Dez Kord, Dīzeh Kard, Dīzeh Khowrd, Dīz-i-Kurd, and Jadval-e Now) is a city in Dezhkord Rural District, Sedeh District, Eqlid County, Fars Province, Iran. At the 2006 census, its population was 4,187, in 975 families.

References 

Populated places in Eqlid County
Cities in Fars Province